The African Championships in Athletics is a quadrennial event which began in 1979. Confederation of African Athletics accepts only athletes who are representing one of the organisation's African member states and the body recognises records set at editions of the African Athletics Championships.

Men's records

Women's records

Mixed

References
General
CAA: African Championships records. 31 May 2019 updated
Specific

External links
 CAA web site

African Championships
R
African Championships